The 1986 K League Championship was the second competition of the K League Championship, and was held to decide the fourth champions of the K League. It was contested between winners of two stages of the regular season, and was played over two legs.

Qualified teams

First leg

Second leg

See also
1986 K League

External links
RSSSF

 
 

K League Championship
1986 in South Korean football
K League